Sara Vidorreta (Zaragoza, June 18, 1999) is a Spanish actress, known, among other things, for her participation in the television series Amar es para siempre among other television series.

Biography 
She was born in 1999 in Zaragoza, Spain, and at the age of eighteen she moved to Madrid to pursue her acting career.

She began her career with roles in the series Vis a Vis and the Telecinco series El padre de Caín and Lo que escondían sus ojos.

In 2018, she joined the cast of the second season of the series La Reina del Sur with her role as Rocío Aljarafe, whose grandmother in the fiction is played by Luisa Gavasa, also from Zaragoza.

In 2019, she participated in Servir y proteger and starred in Telecinco's Secretos de Estado. In 2020, she appeared in the ninth season of Antena 3's daily series Amar es para siempre, playing Emma Sáez Abascal, as well as the Amazon Prime Video series El Cid.

In September 2021 she leaves the series Amar es para siempre and participates in the TV series shorts El tiempo que te doy.

Filmography

References 

Spanish television actresses
21st-century Spanish actresses
Living people
1999 births